Basler may refer to:
 an inhabitant or native of canton of Basel-Stadt, or canton of Basel-Landschaft, or Basel, Switzerland
 Basler (fashion), German fashion brand
 Basler (weapon), the German term for the baselard dagger
 Basler Electric, a manufacturer of power systems 
 Mario Basler, (born 1968), a German former footballer
 Roy Basler, (1906-1989), American historian
 Basler BT-67, a remanufactured DC-3 aircraft produced by Basler Turbo Conversions